In mathematics, the Robinson–Schensted–Knuth correspondence, also referred to as the RSK correspondence or RSK algorithm, is a combinatorial bijection between matrices  with non-negative integer entries and pairs  of semistandard Young tableaux of equal shape, whose size equals the sum of the entries of .
It is a generalization of the Robinson–Schensted correspondence, in the sense that taking  to be a permutation matrix, the pair  will be the pair of standard tableaux associated to the permutation under the Robinson–Schensted correspondence.

The Robinson–Schensted–Knuth correspondence extends many of the remarkable properties of the Robinson–Schensted correspondence, notably its symmetry: transposition of the matrix  results in interchange of the tableaux .

The Robinson–Schensted–Knuth correspondence

Introduction 

The Robinson–Schensted correspondence is a bijective mapping between permutations and pairs of standard Young tableaux, both having the same shape. This bijection can be constructed using an algorithm called Schensted insertion, starting with an empty tableau and successively inserting the values σ1,…,σn of the permutation σ at the numbers 1,2,…n; these form the second line when σ is given in two-line notation:

.

The Schensted insertion easily generalizes to the case where σ has repeated entries; in that case the correspondence will produce a semistandard tableau  rather than a standard tableau, but  will still be a standard tableau.

Two-line arrays 

The two-line array (or generalized permutation)  corresponding to a matrix  is defined as

 

 , and
 if  and  then .

Example 

The two-line array corresponding to

is

Definition of the correspondence 

Example 

In the above example, the result of applying the Schensted insertion to successively insert 1,3,3,2,2,1,2 into an initially empty tableau results in a tableau , and an additional standard tableau  recoding the successive shapes, given by

and after replacing the entries 1,2,3,4,5,6,7 in  successively by 1,1,1,2,2,3,3 one obtains the pair of semistandard tableaux

Direct definition of the RSK correspondence 

The above definition uses the Schensted algorithm, which produces a standard recording tableau , and modifies it to take into account the first line of the two-line array and produce a semistandard recording tableau; this makes the relation to the Robinson–Schensted correspondence evident. It is natural however to simplify the construction by modifying the shape recording part of the algorithm to directly take into account the first line of the two-line array; it is in this form that the algorithm for the RSK correspondence is usually described.

Here is a detailed example of this construction of both semistandard tableaux. Corresponding to a matrix

one has the two-line array

The following table shows the construction of both tableaux for this example

Combinatorial properties of the RSK correspondence

The case of permutation matrices 

If  is a permutation matrix then RSK outputs standard Young Tableaux (SYT),  of the same shape . Conversely, if  are SYT having the same shape , then the corresponding matrix  is a permutation matrix. As a result of this property by simply comparing the cardinalities of the two sets on the two sides of the bijective mapping we get the following corollary:

Corollary 1: For each  we have 

Symmetry 

Let  be a matrix with non-negative entries.

In particular for the case of permutation matrices, one recovers the symmetry of the Robinson–Schensted correspondence:

So there is a one-one correspondence between involutions   and tableaux  

 

Where .

Symmetric matrices 

Let  and let the RSK algorithm map the matrix  to the pair , where  is an SSYT of shape . Then the map  establishes a bijection between symmetric matrices with row()  and SSYT's of type .

Applications of the RSK correspondence

Cauchy's identity 

The Robinson–Schensted–Knuth correspondence provides a direct bijective proof of the following celebrated identity for symmetric functions:

 

where   are Schur functions.

Kostka numbers 

Fix partitions , then

 

References 

 

Algebraic combinatorics
Combinatorial algorithms
Permutations
Symmetric functions
Donald Knuth